The 1946–47 Ashes series consisted of five cricket Test matches, each of six days with five hours play each day and eight ball overs. Unlike pre-war Tests in Australia, matches were not timeless and played to a finish. It formed part of the MCC tour of Australia in 1946–47 and England played its matches outside the Tests in the name of the Marylebone Cricket Club. The England team was led by the veteran Wally Hammond and his vice-captain Norman Yardley with the strong batting line up of Len Hutton, Cyril Washbrook, Bill Edrich, Denis Compton and Joe Hardstaff, but a weak bowling attack that relied on pre-war bowlers like the 37-year-old Bill Voce of Bodyline fame and the mercurial leg-spinner Doug Wright. The two successes of the tour were the newly capped Alec Bedser, who would carry the England bowling attack until 1955, and Godfrey Evans who would be England's first choice wicketkeeper until 1959. England had drawn the Victory Tests 2–2 in 1945 and were thought to be equal in strength, but Hammond lost 3–0 to Don Bradman's Australian team which had only two other pre-war players – Lindsay Hassett and Sid Barnes, who had played 5 Tests between them – and was packed with fresh talent in the shape of Arthur Morris, Keith Miller, Ray Lindwall, Colin McCool, Ernie Toshack and Don Tallon. There were several controversial umpiring decisions which assumed greater significance as they favoured Australia and in particular Don Bradman.

"Few seasons have created so much advance interest as 1946–47", a tour had been planned for 1940–41, but this was cancelled due to the Second World War. The Australian Board of Control asked for a rapid resumption of Test cricket to revive the sport in Australia, which had not hosted a Test match since 1937. Their case was made in person by the Attorney-General of Australia Dr. H.V. Evatt and the Marylebone Cricket Club reluctantly agreed as it wanted to re-establish cricketing relations and needed money to rebuild cricket in post-war Britain. The MCC asked Hammond to lead a "Goodwill Tour" and he was told that good sportsmanship was more important than winning the series, which could be seriously contested later in the 1948 Ashes series. As a result, he looked on the tour as an extended holiday, a view not shared by Don Bradman, who was determined to win, and this led to a strained relationship between the two captains. The tour itself was a great success as crowds flocked to see the matches – more than in any series in Australia since – and it made a record £50,000 profit for the MCC.

First Test – Brisbane

Preliminaries
Cause of the dead Brisbane wicket when Australia batted was the drought which had been suffered in Queensland for such a long period...People who were praying for water were among those to give the tourists a tremendous Brisbane welcome. Rain had fallen in every match in which the Englishmen had played and the record was maintained until the end of the tour, and the Test storm at Brisbane, the second of the match, was the worst I have ever witnessed.
Clif Cary
Due to the war this was the first Test to be played in Australia since 3 March 1937 and there were eight Australian debutants; Ian Johnson, Ray Lindwall, Colin McCool, Keith Miller, Arthur Morris, Don Tallon, Ernie Toshack and George Tribe. However, Johnson, Lindwall, McCool, Miller, Tallon and Toshack had played in an Australia vs New Zealand match the previous season which was belatedly recognised as a Test, the only game between the two countries treated as such before 1973. As a result, only Morris and Tribe are now seen as debutants with vice-captain Lindsay Hassett having played only four Tests before the war and Sid Barnes one. Don Bradman made himself available for selection at the last moment against the advice of his doctor due to the severe attack of fibrositis during the war, an ailment from which the England captain Wally Hammond also suffered. There were no English debutants; Hammond, Len Hutton, Cyril Washbrook, Bill Edrich, Denis Compton, Paul Gibb, Bill Voce and Doug Wright were all pre-war players, vice-captain Norman Yardley had played one Test before the war and Alec Bedser and Jack Ikin had debuted against India in 1946. The vaunted England batting line up had done well so far on the tour, with Hutton making 522 runs (87.00), Washbrook 461 runs (51.22), Edrich 221 runs (44.20), Compton 423 runs (60.43) and Hammond 277 runs (55.40), but their bowling had been weakened by injuries. Gibbs was preferred as wicketkeeper over Godfrey Evans because of his batting form in South Africa in 1938–39. There had been a drought in Queensland since 1941 and the curator had tried boring for water without success. The Woolloongabba wicket, traditionally green and helpful to fast bowlers, was a dry, lifeless brown and good for runs. Bradman won the toss and had no difficulty in choosing to bat first.

Australia – First Innings
Bradman had only made 28, when he played Bill Voce into the slips. Jack Ikin caught the ball and threw it high in the air in joy. He had caught the great Bradman, and Australia, he thought, were three down for under a hundred on a good wicket. That was how it looked to Ikin, to some of the other English players and some of the crowd, and that was how it looked to me sitting watching from the dressing room. Bradman, however, thought it was a bump ball and he stayed, as he was fully entitled to do if there was any doubt in his mind... the umpire gave him not out and he went on to make 187 of Australia's total of 645.
Keith Miller

The innings began well for England as Wally Hammond caught Arthur Morris in the slips and Alec Bedser had Don Bradman struggling in his third over, the Australian captain twice edging the ball to the close fielders. He was protected by Sid Barnes who controlled the strike and hooked the England bowlers until "Big Al" jumped up like a goalkeeper, knocked up the ball and took the catch on the rebound. Barnes (31) was officially reprimanded for using the hook and eliminated this stroke from his repertoire for the rest of the series. At 72/2 Bradman was still struggling on 28 after an hour at the crease when he gave his famous catch to Jack Ikin off Bill Voce. The England players were so sure it was out (along with half the Australian team in the dressing room) that they did not immediately appeal and did so only after Bradman refused to walk. In a controversial umpiring decision Umpire Borwick gave him not out and Bradman later said he thought he had jammed the ball into the ground before it went to Ikin and that he was willing to let the umpire be the judge. Hammond was furious at what he saw as gamesmanship that only spoke to the Australian captain when calling the toss for the rest of the series. After this incident Bradman recovered his confidence and with Bedser off the field due to a stomach ailment (a legacy of his service in Italy) made 159 runs in 160 minutes. His vice-captain Lindsay Hassett dug himself in for 128 and they added 274 for the third wicket. Hassett's brother was getting married that day and agreed to wait until he was out before they began the service. They gave up when he was 97 and he was still on 98 when they finished. Bradman was bowled by Bill Edrich (3/107) early on the second day and Hassett added another 106 runs with his fellow-Victorian Keith Miller who hit 6 fours and a six in his 79. Hassett also hit a six, but was dropped three times before he was caught by Norman Yardley off Bedser (2/159). The English leg-spinner Doug Wright (5/167) had Miller lbw, but the wicketkeeper Paul Gibb dropped Colin McCool off Bedser for 1 and McCool (95) and Ian Johnson (47) took the score to 595/5 by the end of the second day. Most of the third day was lost to heavy rain and bad light. When play resumed it was thought that Australia would declare, but Bradman gave 'a crooked little smile..."I remember when England made 900 against us and kept us in the field for three days"' and 10 minutes before play he told Hammond that he was going to bat on. "Bradman adopted his grim Napoleonic pose, as if the fate of his country rested on the retention of 'the Ashes'" and as the batting captain told the ground staff not to cut the grass on the pitch and had a three-ton roller pulled over the wicket to draw up the moisture. Australia would not be batting for long and this increased the pace of the wicket for his fast bowlers, but a former Australian player called it "kicking a beaten opponent when he is down". The last 5 Australian wickets fell for 50 runs, mostly from Ray Lindwall who hit 3 fours and 2 sixes in his 31. Australia's 645 was their highest total at home, overtaking the 604 made in their previous home Test at Melbourne in 1936–37.

England – First Innings
... hailstones fell the size of golf-balls, and the trim field was swiftly reduced to a lake whereon floated the stumps. What was equally extraordinary was the strength of the tropical Queensland sun which next morning sucked away the moisture, so against all prediction, and thanks also to the sandy soil perfect for drainage, play was possible sharp at time. I recall broadcasting home from the ground... describing the scene of desolation with part of the playing arena still under a foot of water... English listeners who had gone to bed with this comforting information had to be told when they woke up next morning that fifteen English wickets had fallen and the game was over.
E.W. Swanton

Len Hutton and Cyril Washbrook went out to bat with thunder in the air and Hutton never settled down to the short-pitched bowling of Lindwall and Miller and was bowled for 7 in "a real shock attack...Miller's success was gained by one ball of perfection mixed with many of faulty direction which had England's record holder twisting and turning in a most unbatsmanlike fashion". Soon after Bill Edrich came out play was stopped for bad light as a thunderstorm broke over the ground. Play resumed only 10 minutes late the next day, but "England were twice caught on sticky wickets. They stood no chance. On a typical Brisbane sticky the good length ball and the half-volley became almost unplayable. Sometimes it rose chest high. At others it skidded along the ground." In their "opening blitz" Keith Miller dug the ball in short and "nearly every ball from Lindwall rose head high". "Edrich batted for 105 minutes. He suffered more than 40 body blows with a nonchalant contempt for danger and seemed content to be battered black and blue rather than lose his wicket. It was grim concentration and unflinching courage of the type rarely seen in Australia, and he was undaunted even after a terrific sickener under the ribs from Miller".  He was out for 16, but Alan Kippax said it was "one of the best knocks he had ever witnessed" and worthy of a century. Wally Hammond had made his finest innings just such a wicket at Melbourne in 1936–37 while making 32 and here made the same number of runs, which Arthur Morris called it "the most thorough batting lesson he had ever received" Ray Lindwall wrote that Hammond and Edrich "were hit on the body repeatedly. Their concentration never faltered and their skill never waned...This was vintage batting of a kind that probably no Australian could produce". Miller used a limited leg-trap and an English pressman wrote that this was Bodyline, to the anger of Vic Richardson, Alan Kippax and Clarrie Grimmett who had seen the real thing. Miller slowed his pace as the ball leapt so much that it could hit the batsman, but not get them out and dismissed all five batsman that day, his 7/60 in the innings remaining his best return for Australia for the rest of his career. Only three hours play were allowed that day and just after Hammond and Yardley walked off after appealing for light a second thunderstorm hit Brisbane. "Those who huddled in the pavilion...will never forget (as will the residents of Brisbane, who lost thousands of planes of glass) the darkness that came over the ground and the roar of the storm coming in the distance. This was the day when jagged pieces of hail, as big as cricket balls, plummeted on the ground, and the covers and the stumps went swirling away in the flood". In 30 minutes the ground was a lake with the water almost reaching the height of the picket fence on the boundary. At any other venue the game would have ended, but the drought-stricken ground soaked up most of the water overnight, the Queensland sun soon dried out the ground and play began on time at noon, much to the surprise to some pressmen and players who arrived late. Ernie Toshack's left-arm medium pace should have won him a hatful of wickets the previous day, but he could not bowl as Bradman suggested. So, before play began Bradman took him down the pitch and showed him exactly where he wanted him to bowl and even make him bowl a practice over alongside to make sure he got it right. Resuming on 117/5 Hammond and Yardley were both out to Toshack (3/17), the Yorkshire vice-captain after a gritty innings of 29 over two hours, and Miller wrapped up the tail to have England out for 141.

England – Second Innings
Bradman made England follow on 504 runs behind, Hutton was caught by Sid Barnes off Miller's first ball, Washbrook was out the same way and Ernie Toshack had Edrich lbw to leave them 32/3. Only Denis Compton (15) stayed in for over an hour and eight batsmen got into double figures. Wally Hammond hit Toshack for two sixes and played so well on the sticky pitch that the Australians thought he was "bound to make many runs in the series, but from that moment nothing went right for him". Under Bradman's guidance Toshack took 6/82, Miller missed out on a 10 wicket haul with 2/17 and George Tribe took his best Test figures of 2/48. Ray Lindwall was taken to hospital  with suspected malaria from his service in the Soloman Islands, but was found to be chickenpox which caused more concern as he may have infected the rest of the team. Lindwall was replaced by twelfth man Ken Meuleman, Colin McCool bowled only one over in the match and Ian Johnson was not used at all. The only real stand was that of 47 between Jack Ikin (32) and Paul Gibb (11) as England were out for 172 having lost 15 wickets in  hours.

Result
The First Test at Brisbane taught the Englishmen many things and on the second day one English player summed up those thoughts. He said to me – "We are the first Ambassadors ever embroiled in a war while on a goodwill mission." And war it was, even though it was waged on only one side.
Clif Cary
Australia won the First Test by an innings and 332 runs to take a 1–0 lead in the series. It was their first victory over England at Brisbane and was their largest victory in Tests, overtaking their previous best of an innings and 200 runs in the Fifth Test at Melbourne in 1936–37, their last match against England in Australia. This remained a record until Australia beat South Africa by an innings and 360 runs at Johannesburg in 2001–02, but it remains their greatest victory in Australia and against England. Ironically in their previous Test against England in 1938 Australia lost by an innings and 579 runs, the largest margin of victory in Tests. It was the first time that two sides had won and lost by an innings in successive Tests. Australia's 645 was their highest total at home, beating the 604 they made in the Fifth Test of 1936–37. The win was regarded as a lottery as torrential rain ruined the wicket as England started to bat, but in Brisbane it was ever thus. On Bradman's Test debut in 1928–29 Australia was caught batting after a rainstorm and were out for 66. They lost by a record 675 runs and Bradman was dropped for the only time in his career. In 1936–37 Australia was caught again on a rain-affected wicket and were out for 58, Bradman made a duck and lost his first Test as captain by 322 runs. In the next Test between Australia and England at the Gabba in 1950–51 20 wickets fell in an afternoon after another rainstorm. 77,344 attended the match with receipts of £14,515.

Second Test – Sydney

Preliminaries
From the batsman's viewpoint it looked perfect. It was a rusty brown, but seemed to hold a thousand runs, and both Hammond and Bradman were enthusiastic in their keenness to win the toss. When the England skipper called correctly he smiled with confident pleasure.... Imagine Hammond's surprise when before an hour had passed the wicket, which looked so docile, was in fact a dangerous spin-taking nightmare.
Clif Cary
Arriving in Sydney England tried to put the disastrous Brisbane Test behind them. The wicketkeeper-batsman Paul Gibb was dropped in favour of Godfrey Evans, who was to hold the position for 13 years and who did not concede a bye in the Test. Bill Voce had pulled a muscle and the off-spinner Peter Smith was brought into the team for the traditional spinning wicket at the SCG, but already had a numb spinning finger from an injury on the ship that brought the team to Australia. Ray Lindwall was still ill with chickenpox and was replaced by the tidy fast-medium bowler Fred Freer of Victoria. The pitch looked perfect, Wally Hammond called correctly and chose to bat.

England – First Innings

The game was all but decided in an evil hour Hutton, Compton and Hammond himself – the flower of England's batting – went one by one to the high, slow, teasing spin of Colin McCool and Ian Johnson, each giving the ball more and more air as though trying to discover whether there was any parabola they could not describe without impelling the forward step that would have allowed the ball to be met on the full-pitch or the half-volley.
E.W. Swanton
Fred Freer (1/25) began his Test career by bowling Cyril Washbrook for 1, but though he kept his line and length Keith Miller was wild and they and Toshack only bowled 23 overs in the innings. The spinners bowled 73 overs as the pitch took spin on the first day, against all expectation. Len Hutton (30) and Bill Edrich (71) added 78 for the second wicket before Ian Johnson removed him with his third ball in Tests, caught behind down the leg side. Don Tallon promptly took two more catches off Colin McCool (3/73) to dismiss Hammond and Compton and England were 99/4. Bradman had pulled a thigh muscle in the First Test and was granted permission by Hammond to retire from play, Ken Meuleman taking his place and Hassett taking command. Johnson had not bowled in the First Test, but now had a spell of 11–8–3–1 as the England batsmen remained glued to the wicket. Hammond had previously told Compton to stop 'capering about' the wicket and "The oracle was listened to with great respect, and his dictum was largely taken up by those who followed him in the England XIs". Jack Ikin, whose usually played within the crease anyway made a gritty 60 and added 49 with the fighting Edrich. Thereafter wickets fell steadily to Johnson who ended with 6/42 as England was spun out for 255.

Australia – First Innings
We could have played on, but it was a Test match and we just had to win. I realised something drastic had to be done or three wickets might be lost. So I appealed after every second ball. I complained of the people moving about, the light, and, in fact, anything, in an effort to get the appeal upheld. Hammond and Yardley were inspecting the wet pitch. I knew there was a chance of losing valuable wickets so I just kept on appealing until the umpires answered me.
Sid Barnes

The situation was not yet lost, England had at least played on the spinning wicket first and it could only get worse for Australia. Doug Wright was the terror of the County Championship for running through side on just such wickets and Hammond also had Peter Smith and the part-time spin of Ikin, Compton and Hutton. Sid Barnes and Arthur Morris only batted for 9 minutes when the rain came down and the teams left the field. On their return Bill Edrich (3/71) made the ball kick up with his fast bowling, and Morris was bowled while taking evasive action. Ian Johnson  came in as a nightwatchman and he and Barnes angered the crowd by launching into a series of bad light appeals – up to 12 were counted – before the umpires gave way and play was ended with an hour to spare. This gamesmanship ensured that Australia would not have to play on a sticky wicket like England at Brisbane and allowed Bradman to rest his leg until play resumed on the Monday. Clif Cary opined in his radio commentary that the light was bright enough to play by and the umpires had been pressured into a decision by the Australian batsmen, as did the English pressmen. They were labelled "biased, unsportsmanlike squealers" and that Barnes and his captain Bradman would never use such underhand tactics, but at the end of the series Barnes admitted on radio that he had bluffed the umpires into the decision. Sunday was a rest day and the sun dried out the wicket beautifully, it rolled to perfection and produced the flat wicket anticipated on the first day. Barnes had been reprimanded for hooking the ball in the First Test and as a result denied himself strokeplay and slowly ground his way through the day. Johnson was out for 7, and Barnes added 59 with Lindsay Hassett (34) and 63 with Keith Miller (40). Alec Bedser (1/153)  bowled well and stopped the runs from getting away, but with defensive fields many catches went begging, but Peter Smith (2/172) failed to find his form (he was hospitalised with appendicitis on the tour). Don Bradman had lowered himself down the order and "limped as if in extreme pain, and several times lay on the ground as if ill" Wright (1/169) "bowled beautifully with the most wretched luck", in one over "On four occasions Hammond, usually most undemonstrative, threw his hands in the air as the ball beat Bradman and shaved the stumps, and in between these near dismissals there was a confident appeal for leg before wicket. When Bradman was on 22 when he appeared to snick another catch to Jack Ikin at short leg, but "this time there may have been some cause for doubt; it was an appeal that could have gone either way". Bradman was given not out and by the end of the day Barnes was 109, Bradman 52 and Australia 252/4. On the Tuesday Bradman gave "an amazing exhibition in amassing 234 runs – that is, amazing for one who was supposed to be a cripple. He played all the shots, pulled leg muscle and all, and often ran between the wickets with the speed of an Olympic sprinter". Forced to play off the back foot due to his pulled leg muscle Bradman still looked like he had three strokes for every one of Barnes and by the end of the day had caught him up in runs. During this long partnership Len Hutton joked with the crowd on the boundary and ate 14 bananas given to him from the Hill. In desperation Hammond called on his vice-captain Norman Yardley to bowl his medium pacers, which he did not even do for Yorkshire, and to everyone's surprise he caught Bradman lbw for 234. It was only the second time Bradman had been lbw in a Test against England, the first being to Maurice Tate on his debut in 1928. He had added 405 for the fifth wicket with Barnes, and in 1946 this was the highest partnership for that wicket in Test or first-class cricket and the second highest Test partnership after the 451 Bradman-Ponsford partnership at the Oval in 1934. In the next over Barnes hit Bedser to Ikin also for 234, his maiden Test century and the highest score of his career. He said later that he had got himself out so as to have the same score as Bradman "which could well have been so for he was a man of quixotic mood and temperament". However, Alec Bedser wrote "It was when I was bowling to Sid at Sydney that I first discovered that I could move the ball to leg by use of my wrist and fingers...I held the ball in the same manner as a leg-break bowler with the fingers across the seam...and on pitching I was surprised to see the ball go away like a leg-break. It also surprised Sid Barnes". Australia ended the fourth day on 571/6. The next morning the lower order struck out, with Fred Freer hitting 3 fours and a six in his 28 not out and George Tribe 5 fours in his 25 not out until  Bradman declared on 659/8.

England – Second Innings
Those who were lucky enough to see this remarkable display must have grieved with me that such a superlative innings was nipped off in its golden prime. He began by clipping the short stuff so hard that even if Australia had had 15 fieldsmen, the fours would still have come. Never have I seen a Test opening attack hit so hard.
Bill O'Reilly
Len Hutton and Cyril Washbrook walked out 404 runs behind on the first innings and England needing to bat out five sessions and 24 minutes to save the game. Hutton survived an lbw appeal from Fred Freer on his first ball, then hit 12 runs off the rest of the over. In the absence of Ray Lindwall the fast bowler Keith Miller "bumped the ball with more fury and recklessness than anyone in years" and even appealed for lbw when Hutton ducked and the ball hit his back, but his first over went for 11 more runs. Freer's second over gave another 9 and Miller's second over 15, but on the last ball before lunch Hutton's glove strap was caught on his bat and he overbalanced and trod on the wicket. He had made 37 runs in 24 minutes of "batting champagne" which "was the talk of Sydney for the rest of the match" receiving "four times as much publicity as the huge totals of 234", Johnnie Moyes called it "a glorious piece of batting, a choice miniature that I shall carry with me always" Bill Edrich came in and another 69 runs were added before Washbrook was out for 40. Denis Compton found his form and the 'Middlesex Twins' put on 102 for the third wicket. Compton was caught by Bradman off Freer (2/49) for 54, but Hammond came in to see out the day with England 247/3, still 157 runs behind with five hours of play left. When Edrich "reached his century he was accorded one of the most sustained ovations I have heard, and no one deserved it more...the roar when he reached it was it the Heavens had split". Hammond made 37, his highest score of the series before he was caught by Don Tallon off Colin McCool (5/109) and Edrich continued resolutely until bowled by McCool for 119 in 5 hours, top-scoring in both innings and returning the best English bowling analysis of the match. Norman Yardley hit 4 fours in his 35 before he too was bowled by McCool and the last four wickets fell for 25 runs to have England out for 371 with more than two hours before stumps.

Result
Australia won the Second Test by an innings and 33 runs to go 2–0 up in the series. It was the first time they had defeated England in successive Tests by an innings since Andrew Stoddart's tour of 1897–98.  It was the third Test in a row that  Australia had made its highest home score; 604 in the Fifth Test at Melbourne in 1936–37, 645 in the First Test and 659/8 in the Second Test in the current series. The match had an attendance of 196,253 and £26,544 was made in receipts.

Third Test – Melbourne

Preliminaries
With two defeats Wally Hammond would have to win the last three Tests to regain the Ashes, though Don Bradman had done this in the last series in Australia. The Melbourne wicket had a reputation for fast, pacey wickets, but after two shocks at Brisbane and Sydney few were surprised that it was not living up to its reputation; "The 1947 wicket was not as tame as all that, but it was, for Melbourne, exceedingly meek". Ray Lindwall was fit again and resigned his job when his employers refused him leave to play in the Test.  Fred Freer was dropped and the slow left-arm wrist-spin bowler George Tribe was replaced by the leg-spinner Bruce Dooland. Arthur Morris had failed in the two Tests, but was given another chance instead of Ken Meuleman. Peter Smith was ill with appendicitis and James Langridge had strained a muscle in catching practice the day before the match, so Hammond had no spinner apart from Doug Wright and the 37-year-old fast bowler Bill Voce was recalled. Don Bradman won the toss and chose to bat on New Year's Day.

Australia – First Innings
Norman Yardley was bowling to me and, on a perfect pitch, he had been unable to make a single ball do anything. When Ian Johnson came in I told him the ball was not turning an inch. He plunged his left leg down the wicket, missed and was l.b.w. first ball. It had turned nearly a foot!
Keith Miller
Arthur Morris was the first man out for 21, lbw to Alec Bedser (3/99), but Sid Barnes hooked a ball into Bill Edrich's knee at short leg and Hammond insisted that he leave the field for treatment. Barnes (45) added 76 with Bradman before he went the same way as Morris for and Hammond took Lindsay Hassett off Doug Wright for 12. Bill Voce left the field with a strained leg muscle after lunch and Bradman looked set for a big score until he chopped Norman Yardley (2/50) onto his stumps for 79. Yardley, scarcely a change bowler before the tour was only given a bowl because of the injuries, but bowled tidily and moved the ball. Ian Johnson was out lbw first ball and Australia were 188/5 on a good pitch, soon 192/6 when Godfrey Evans snapped up Keith Miller (33) off Wright. Australia's all-round strength came to their rescue as Colin McCool played the innings of his life, 104 not out, adding 63 with Don Tallon (35) and leaving Australia 253/6 at the end of the day. Edrich returned to the fray in the first over of the second day and had Tallon caught behind in the first over, but Bruce Dooland (19) "defended steadily while McCool punished the bowling unmercifully. Hooking and driving with absolute confidence". as they added 83. In the end Edrich (3/50) removed Dooland and Toshack to leave McCool 104 not out and Australia were out for 365

England – First Innings
Edrich should have gather in another hundred in the following Test at Melbourne. He was 89, and batting with audacious unconcern, when Scott gave him out leg before to a ball from Lindwall which even some Australian fieldsmen believed had come from the bat. It was one of the hotly discussed decisions of the tour, and while Edrich was distressed and disappointed he was still able to grin as he walked from the field.
Clif Cary

Ray Lindwall returned to Test bowling by dismissing Len Hutton with a beautiful swinging ball which moved from middle stump to flick the edge of his bat and was caught by Colin McCool at first slip. Bill Edrich joined Cyril Washbrook and together they took the score to 147/1 by the end of the second day, Edrich hit 10 fours in his 85 while Washbrook struck only 1 four in his 54. Resuming in the morning Lindwall (2/62) had Erich lbw for 89, much to his disappointment as like McCool he had been promised £1 a run if he made a century. Edrich had now made the highest score in the last three England innings (71, 119 and 89) and had returned the best figures in the last two Australian innings (3/79 and 3/50) and looked good for a big score. When he returned to the England dressing room he complained that he had hit the ball into his pads and should not have been out. This was overheard by an English pressman and was widely reported, becoming a major point of contention, especially as Denis Compton out lbw to Ernie Toshack when padding up of a ball that landed outside the stumps, causing the Middlesex player to stare at Umpire Scott in disbelief before his walked off. Wally Hammond came on and, annoyed at the two dismissals, gave a simple caught-and-bowled to Bruce Dooland, who then caught and bowled Cyril Washbrook for 62 and England had collapsed from 155/1 to 179/5. Jack Ikin (48) and Norman Yardley (61) dug in for two over hours and restored the innings with a stand of 113 until McCool (2/53) bowled the vice-captain and Dooland (4/69) removed Ikin and Voce with successive balls. With England 298/8 there was still a chance that they could overtake Australia for the first time in the series. Godfrey Evans made 17 and added 26 with Alec Bedser who swung the bat for 27 not out making 27 runs for the last wicket with Wright until the spinner was bowled by Johnson and England were out for 351, 14 runs behind.

Australia – Second Innings
I don't think Bradman appreciated being dismissed by a man who was not considered anywhere approaching county class. It was always amusing to watch the Englishmen when Yardley took a wicket. The first time they seemed fairly amused, but when he was regularly breaking partnerships, their enthusiasm knew no bounds, and it is said that in Melbourne after he had obtained Bradman's wicket for the third time, Yardley blushed profusely when one excited team-mate slapped him on the back and shouted "Well, bowled, Spofforth".
Clif Cary

Bill Voce was still unable to bowl and Bill Edrich opened the bowling. Sid Barnes appealed against the light, which was rejected, and he and Arthur Morris were 32/0 at the end of the third day. They took their stand to 68 when Barnes was caught by Godfrey Evans off Norman Yardley (3/67). The Yorkshireman kept up his reputation as a wicket-taker by dismissing Don Bradman (49) for the third successive time and Keith Miller (34). Yardley usually obtained his wickets in partnership with Alec Bedser (3/176) or Doug Wright (3/131), who bowled so well that batsmen felt they had to hit out at the other end. However Morris batted through the day for his maiden Test century of 155 adding 91 with Bradman, 65 with Miller and 91 with McCool (43) before he was bowled by Bedser. Bedser also accounted for McCool and Ian Johnson was run out for a duck and Australia were 341/7. At this point the game ran away from England as Don Tallon (92) and Ray Lindwall (100) thumped the ball for 154 runs in 99 minutes. Wally Hammond kept the slips in place and Tallon hit 10 fours through the gaps, Lindwall 13 fours and a 6 as the England captain "sphinx-like marched from slip at one end to slip at the other, apparently, as Plum Warner wrote of him, just 'letting the game go on'". When Wright finally caught and bowled Tallon Australia were 495/8 and Lindwall just reached his maiden Test century off 90 balls – by hitting Bedser into the sightscreen – before Dooland and Toshack fell. Tallon's 92 remained the highest score by an Australian wicketkeeper until Rod Marsh equalled it with 92 not out in the 1970-71 Ashes series and surpassed it with 132 against New Zealand in 1973–74. Australia made 536 and England needed 551 runs to win, or to bat out 7 hours for a draw.

England – Second Innings
...it was in this match that the Englishmen publicly rebuked Barnes for his false, senseless but successful light appeals at Sydney. In the final thirty minutes at Melbourne, Yardley, first with Bedser and then Evans, batted on, making no objection, even though the light was atrocious and rain was falling heavily. As England had lost seven wickets and had every chance of losing and none of winning it was a risky policy, but one in keeping with the manner in which Hammond played all the Tests, which to him were only sporting contests of goodwill.
Clif Cary

Len Hutton survived another "opening blitz" from Lindwall and Miller and was the silent partner in a stand of 138 with Cyril Washbrook. They took England to 91/0 at the start of the sixth and last day and had added 137 when Hutton was caught by Bradman off Ernie Toshack after batting almost three hours for 40 runs. Washbrook held the innings together with his 112, bringing all "his concentration to bear he revealed a variety of shots that were a delight to watch, combined with a defence which could as dour as if he had been playing in a blood match against Yorkshire and not merely a Test in Australia". But wickets fell regularly at the other end and at 247/6 England were looking at defeat. With 53 runs in 89 minutes Norman Yardley dug himself in with Wally Hammond, 26 runs in 77 minutes, Alec Bedser, 25 runs in 49 minutes, and Godfrey Evans 0 runs in 15 minutes. The rain helped, but only 45 minutes were lost in the day due to the umpires as the English batsmen refused to appeal for light on the orders of Hammond even though Bradman twice suggested that they come off the field. Bill O'Reilly said "I could not understand why the English batsman seemed loath to appeal against the weather, even when the rain was coming down solidly. There are no praises for gallant gestures in Tests matches". In the end England survived the match on 310/7 with Yardley and Evans still at the crease.

Result
A final memory of Melbourne 1947 is the generosity of the crowd towards Hammond's team. The English press had come under attack for certain loud assertions about umpiring mistakes...but this unpopularity had not rubbed off on the players.
E.W. Swanton
Australia drew with England to maintain their 2–0 series lead and retain the Ashes. It was the third time that a Test match had been drawn in Australia, the previous two were the fifth and eight Tests ever to be played during Alfred Shaw's tour of 1881–82, the last Tests played before the Ashes were inaugurated. 1,562 runs were scored in the Test, only the seventh time in 146 Tests that 1,500 runs had been scored in Anglo-Australian Tests, the last being the 1,601 runs made in four days in the Lords Test of 1930. By taking 2/50 and 3/67 and making 61 and 53 not out Norman Yardley established himself as a Test all-rounder and by dismissing Bradman in each innings he prevented the Don from making a century against England at the MCG for the only time in his career. 343,675 attended the match – second only to the 350,534 at the Third Test at MCG in 1936–37 – with record receipts of £44,063.

Fourth Test – Adelaide

Preliminaries
Alec remembers one occasion in Adelaide in 1947 when he had to bowl for most of one day in 102-degree heat. After his last over, he was completely befuddled and had to be led from the ground by his team mates. Not knowing where he was, he stumbled up the steps through the Father and Son Enclosure, past the Press Box and into the England dressing room. There the team physiotherapist took him into the showers, sat him down on a wooden chair, clothed and still wearing his boots, and turned on the cold tap. It took almost three quarters of an hour for the big Surrey bowler to come round from his heat exhaustion!
Frank Tyson
After the Third Test the MCC team toured Tasmania and Clif Cary of the Sunday Express wrote that "Social successes are one of the causes of their cricket failure...There are tourists who do not give the impression that cricket is their main consideration". This was thought to be aimed at Denis Compton and one Australian Test cricketer told Cary "It will make Compton and others will pull up their socks, and we might never get them out at Adelaide." There were also calls for Wally Hammond to resign the captaincy in favour of Norman Yardley, but these were silenced when he made 188 against South Australia, his 167th – and last – first class century. He became the seventh man to make 50,000 first class runs after W.G. Grace, Jack Hobbs, Phil Mead, Frank Woolley, Patsy Hendren and Herbert Sutcliffe and "for some time afterwards he was kept busy answering congratulatory letters, telegrams, and cables from admirers in all parts of the world". The Adelaide Oval had been "Bradman's Front Lawn" since he had moved to South Australia in 1935 and "if ever a Test wicket was laid down to kill it was that 22 yards long graveyard of a spin bowler's hope. It was as dead and lifeless as Mussolini and at the end of the sixth, and final day, was playing as truly as when the match began". Bill Voce was dropped in favour of the batsman Joe Hardstaff, so England went into the match with only two specialist bowlers – Alec Bedser and Doug Wright. Sid Barnes was ill and was replaced by the Victorian strokemaker Merv Harvey who was promoted into the opening slot. The Test was played in "stifling, almost insufferable heat" with temperatures rising up to 105 °F (40.5 °C) and a brief shower only served to help bind the wicket when it might have started to break. Hammond won the toss and chose to bat.

England – First Innings

...it was grand to see him in the afternoon and early evening gradually get atop of Australia's persevering and skilful attack, and finally dominate it completely with all manner of lovely strokes to the extent of a run a minute off his own bat...Compton's innings, judged from every angle, stands with Bradman's as Sydney as the best played in this series so far.
E.W. Swanton
The fast bowling of Ray Lindwall and Keith Miller was seen off by England's opening partnership as Len Hutton (94) and Cyril Washbrook (65) made another century stand; 137 runs in 178 minutes. Bradman declined to take the new ball when 200 runs were made (as was the custom in those days) and was rewarded when Bruce Dooland (3/133) removed Washbrook and Edrich and Colin McCool caught Hutton lbw. Wally Hammond was in so much pain from fibrositis that he took 12 aspirin before he went out to bat and was bowled by Ernie Toshack for 18 to leave England 202/4. Denis Compton (147) stroked his way to 147, adding 118 with Joe Hardstaff (67), 61 with Jack Ikin (21) and 74 with Norman Yardley (18 not out). It was his third first-class century in a row and "It was amazing to see Compton occasionally run down the pitch, change his mind, and either play the ball like a baseball bunt, or scamper back to ground his bat in time to get the benefit of the doubt on a stumping appeal". Lindwall thought he should have been stumped before he reached his century, "but I could well understand the umpire's explanation...that the glare of the sun suddenly became so intense that he was unable to see clearly the white line of the popping crease". In any case Lindwall quickly ended the innings with the new ball, he caught and bowled Compton to have England 455/7. In the next over he sent Alec Bedser's off-stump cart-wheeling back to the wicketkeeper, then bowled Godfrey Evans first ball, shaved Doug Wright's stumps before bowling him second ball – 3 wickets in 4 balls to end the innings for 460. This was the nearest that Lindwall ever got to a hat-trick.

Australia – First Innings
I was dining that Saturday evening chez Bradman, and with Jessie Bradman and her son John was escaping the rush by leaving an over before the close. We were underneath the stand when there was a tremendous uproar from above. 'That'll be Dad' said John, and he was right. It was. Bradman, b. Bedser 0.
E.W. Swanton

Australia had 30 minutes to bat until stumps, but Merv Harvey was out for 12 runs off 15 balls and Bradman came to the wicket. In the Second Test at Sydney Alec Bedser had caught Sid Barnes with an in-swinging leg-break and had developed this delivery, soon known as Bedser's "Special Ball" and clean-bowled Bradman for a duck. Bradman wrote "The ball with which Alec Bedser bowled me in the Adelaide Test Match was, I think, the finest ever to take my wicket. It must have come three-quarters of the way straight on my off-stump, then suddenly dipped in to pitch on the leg stump, only to turn off the pitch and hit the middle and off stumps". He returned to the Australian dressing room telling the waiting batsmen that it had been an unplayable ball. Keith Miller thought he was making excuses for being out for a duck and that "He did no service to those who still had to face Alec", but Bradman maintained that it had been good enough to bowl him if he had been on 300. Australia began the third day on 24/2, but soon made a complete recovery from their bad start. Doug Wright (3/152) had trouble with his no balls due to his odd run up "He waves his arms widely, and rocks on his legs like a small ship pitching and tossing in a fairly heavy sea. Whenever he bowls in Australia there are people who whistle and cat-call as he goes through his strange approach to the stumps." As a result, Bedser (3/97) was called on to bowl virtually all day until he could barely stand from heat exhaustion. Bill Edrich (0/88) had opened the bowling, but could make no impression on the dull pitch and Norman Yardley (3/101) was called upon to bowl 31 overs. Morris made 122 with 12 fours and 2 sixes, adding 189 with Lindsay Hassett (78). Keith Miller hit his maiden Test century; 141 not out in  hours with 9 fours and a six, adding 150 with Ian Johnson (52), 27 with Lindwall (20) and 63 with Dooland (29). Toshack was brilliantly run out by Edrich for a duck and Australia were out for 487, a lead of 27 on the first innings.

England – Second Innings
His unbroken partnership of 85 with Compton at Adelaide revealed admirable fighting qualities, and cricket intelligence. He made only five scoring shots, 2, 1, 2, 4, 1, in his stay of 133 minutes, and he was at the wickets 95 minutes before he opened his account. Mainly he was watching his partner take charge of the game, but of the 276 balls sent down during their time together Evans took 97 of them, and not only helped to save the team from certain defeat, but also enabled Compton to join the select band who have compiled a century in each innings of a Test.
Clif Cary
Though delayed by 23 minutes by a short thunderstorm and bounced by Lindwall and Miller Len Hutton (76) and Cyril Washbrook (30) made their third century stand – exactly 100 – to match the record of Hobbs and Sutcliffe in 1924–25. They looked set to make more, but Washbrook was given out to a ball that Don Tallon scooped off the ground off Lindwall (2/60). Washbrook "stood there transfixed. Even some of the Australian leg-side fielders expressed amazement". Tallon was known for his impetuous appealing – "he was often roaring before he had studied facts and it was his over-eagerness that brought about the shocking decision", This caused another umpiring controversy, but Tallon maintained the appeal and Bradman backed him. The Australian reporter Ray Robinson wrote "the hesitant umpire would have been wiser to have asked his square-leg colleague whether it carried to the gloves or was gathered on the half-volley". Washbrook told Hammond that the ball had gone into the ground and the England captain tried to locate a press photograph of the ball touching the ground to show the ABC. Bill Edrich made a solid 46, but wickets fell regularly to Ernie Toshack (4/76). Hammond with his last stroke in Australia hit the ball for a certain four until it was superbly taken by Lindwall, "Every time he missed or edged the ball he was out". England were 255/8 when Godfrey Evans joined Denis Compton, only 228 runs ahead and it was essential that they stayed together. Evans, who usually tried to run cheeky singles off almost every ball, spent a record 95 minutes before making a run. Bradman was ready to accept a second draw to ensure that he won the series, set defensive fields, wasted time and "set his side a frightful example by taking minutes almost, to walk lazily after the ball and field it". Clif Cary thought this was his only mistake of the series, as he could have bought the last two wickets for 40–50 runs with a day and a half to make the runs on a perfect pitch. Compton made his second century of the match at the other end and they added 85 for the ninth wicket, but Tallon missed a stumping off Evans on 282/8 and Lindwall thought Compton should have been stumped before he reached three figures. His hundred was hit off the last ball before lunch, but Hammond waited until the first ball after lunch before declaring at 340/8. This decision was much discussed and was thought to be unique, but the West Indies captain Jackie Grant had done this against England at the Queen's Park Oval in Trinidad in 1934–35. It wasted 10 minutes as the teams changed sides.

Australia – Second Innings
Arthur Morris set himself up as a No. 1 for Australia for a while to come...Arthur at his best looked out of the top draw, a left-hander with all the strokes, and only one (much publicized) weakness against certain bowling and in particular against Bedser's.... Yet his record speaks for itself, and what the figures do not say is that few more charming men have played for Australia, and I cannot name one who was more popular with his opponents.
E.W. Swanton
Hammond had left the Australians 3 hours to make 314 runs to win, not impossible as they had some excellent strokemakers in their team. Merv Harvey made no attempt to get the runs and spent 100 minutes making 31, keeping Arthur Morris company in an opening stand of 116 until he was bowled by Yardley. Bradman could have sent Keith Miller in at number 3, both to make quick runs and so that he could avoid a pair of ducks, but he came out himself. He struggled for 20 minutes against Alec Bedser to get off the mark when Umpire Scott called the Surrey bowler for a no ball and the Don got off the mark. Bradman made 56 not out and added 99 with Morris who completed his third successive Test century of 124 not out. Australia finished the day on 214/1 and the game was a draw.

Result
Australia drew the Fourth Test with England to win the series. Denis Compton (147 and 103 not out) and Arthur Morris (122 and 124 not out) became the seventh and eight batsmen to make a pair of centuries in a Test after Warren Bardsley, Jack Russell, Herbert Sutcliffe (twice), Wally Hammond, George Headley (twice) and Eddie Paynter. It was the first time that two batsmen achieved this feat in the same Test, to be repeated by Ian and Greg Chappell against New Zealand in 1973–74. In honour of the event they were presented with silver watches by the South Australian Cricket Association, as was Ray Lindwall for his 3 wickets in 4 balls. 1,502 runs were scored in the Test, the eighth time 1,500 runs had been scored in an Anglo-Australian Test. The full attendance was 135,980 and receipts of £18,117.

Fifth Test – Sydney

Preliminaries
The general positioning of the field and the blocking of the batsmen's known strokes was admirable, and his placing was responsible for at least three of the catches made. He certainly has the knack of keeping his men equable and happy. If there were just a little more punch or bite in his make-up one could regard Yardley as a thoroughly satisfactory England captain of the near future.
E.W. Swanton
The MCC played New South Wales immediately before the Fifth Test and it rained, as in every other match on their tour. The ground staff ran on to cover the MCC-NSW wicket and left the Test wicket under the rain. As a result, it was over-watered and while not dangerous it favoured the bowlers and produced the best cricket of the series. Len Hutton was sent to hospital after being hit on the chin by a Ginty Lush bouncer in that match, but returned to make 40 and 74. Jack Fingleton called on Lindwall and Miller to not subject him to another fast bowling barrage, which could damage his weakened left arm and end his career. Wally Hammond had a crippling attack of fibrositis the day before the Test and was unable to turn without pain and reluctantly withdrew in favour of Norman Yardley. He remained in the dressing room and gave advice, but there was an improvement in the way England played on the field. Joe Hardstaff was also unfit and they were replaced by the popular Surrey opener Laurie Fishlock and the off-spinner Peter Smith, who had just taken a record 9/121 at the SCG. Sid Barnes returned to the Australian team after his illness and Merv Harvey was dropped, the batsman Ron Hamence replaced the injured Ian Johnson and George Tribe was preferred to Bruce Dooland. Yardley won the toss and chose to bat.

England – First Innings
I must say when I bowled at Len I felt a sense of personal grudge I have never known against any other batsman.  Ray did too. I suppose Len suffered a greater barrage from the two of us than any other player in the world. We both put in that little bit extra against Len, and he had to take it time after time... he had a poker face and never expressed either elation or disappointment. I tried my wickedest bumpers, hoping that I would have the satisfaction of seeing him look scared.
Keith Miller
After a good length ball from Ray Lindwall removed Cyril Washbrook's stumps Len Hutton and Bill Edrich weathered the fast bowling and added 150 for the second wicket. Edrich was caught off Lindwall for 60, Laurie Fishlock fell to Colin McCool, and Lindwall knocked Denis Compton's bat out of his hands and on the stumps. Norman Yardley came in and appealed for bad light, which was turned down even though it was so dim that the Australian cameramen were unable to take clear photographs. Lindwall removed Yardley and Jack Ikin and England ended the day on 237/6.  Hutton had batted throughout the day with typical Yorkshire grit for 122 not out, but was struck down by acute tonsillitis the following day and was taken to hospital with a temperature of 103 °F (39.5 °C). He was ill for the rest of the Test – a severe blow to the England team – and was flown back to England for a throat operation immediately afterwards. His latest innings gave him 888 runs (111.00) against Australia. The Saturday Hutton took ill was lost to rain, but on the Sunday the field was dried by the sun and mushrooms grew in the outfield. Lindwall bowled Godfrey Evans and Peter Smith in the morning to give him 7/63, Miller had Doug Wright and England were out for 280. Lindwall thought that George Tribe had bowled just as well, but had no luck and returned 0/95.

Australia – first innings
Cutting a leg-break is always dangerous, and cutting Wright is a form of suicide. Why a bowler of his skill failed to get more test-match wickets always mystified me; there was of course the marked tendency to bowl no-balls, but he sent down so many good ones, and worried and beat the batsmen so often, that he should have had better results...he seemed always likely to get wickets. It is one of the toughest problems of captaincy to know when to remove a man like that from the firing -line.
Johnnie Moyes
Sid Barnes (71) and Arthur Morris (57) added 126 for Australia's first wicket until both were removed by Alec Bedser (2/49) soon after tea. Despite the 102 °F (39 °C) heat, the English fielding improved on the previous Tests, with Godfrey Evans, Denis Compton and Laurie Fishlock to the fore. Compton chased a piece of paper across the ground and grabbing it with a rugby tackle to the laughter of the 40,000 crowd. McCool and Tribe had managed to turn the ball on the first day and at last Doug Wright found things turning his way. Hammond had set stereotyped fields in the first four Tests and was loath to change them, but the new captain Norman Yardley was keen to take advice from his professionals. He changed the field as each batsmen came in and gave Wright a field of close catchers instead of trying to save runs.  At the start of each Test Wright would receive telegrams and letters from well-wishers who had lamented his bad luck "Never a match went by in which he did not hopelessly defeat the defences of the leading run-getters. Times out of number he had Barnes, Bradman, Hassett and their like groping forward hypnotised by the magic of his spinning witchcraft". Wright bowled unchanged for nearly two hours and took the wickets of Don Bradman, who came down the wicket, misjudged the spin and was bowled for 12, and Keith Miller taken by Jack Ikin at slip. Australia started the fourth day on 189/4 and Bedser and Wright bowled unchanged for 11 overs each. Bedser shut up his end and conceded only 15 runs while Wright span his way through the Australian batting with a spell of 5/42 with Hassett, McCool, Tallon, Lindwall and Tribe all falling to catches close to the wicket. Only Ron Hamence stood up and made 31 not out in 1 hours and when Ernie Toshack was run out against Australia were dismissed for 253, a deficit of 17 runs.

England – Second Innings
In return England failed to recover from Ray Lindwall (2/46) catching Laurie Fishlock lbw through sheer pace with the first ball of the innings. Cyril Washbrook, Bill Edrich and Peter Smith all made 24 and only Denis Compton made more with 76 before he was caught in Toshack's leg-trap. Colin McCool took 5/44 and "the English batsmen seemed like rabbits fascinated in the presence of a snake". As Hutton was unable to bat England were out for 186 on the last day, leaving Australia 214 to win.

Australia – Second Innings

On a pitch taking spin Yardley depended on Bedser and Wright to win the match and the spinner came on after only one over from Edrich. The roller had pressed the wicket and Sid Barnes and Arthur Morris decided to make runs while its effects lasted. They made 45 for the first wicket when Morris gambled on a third run when Compton misfielded and was run out. Bradman edged a ball from Wright to Edrich at slip, who dropped it, but Barnes was taken by Evans off Bedser. In the end it was Edrich's dropped catch that decided the day as Bradman and Hassett dropped anchor and took an hour to make 13 runs, tiring out the bowlers as they did so. When Bedser and Wright were rested they attacked their replacements Edrich and Smith, who were replaced by Yardley and Wright after two overs. Australia reached tea with 110/2 and in the last session they chased the runs. Bradman was out to Bedser (2/76) for 63 and Hassett to Wright (2/93) for 47, but Keith Miller was told to get runs quickly before time ran out. "No message ever had a readier recipient" and he struck 7 fours in his unbeaten 34 off 44 balls. A grateful Bradman spoke of "the sheer artistry, the classical style and power of an innings by Miller" when interviewed just after the Test. Hamance was out for 1, but Australia reached 214/5 and won by 5 wickets.

Result
Australia won the Fifth Test by 5 wickets to win the series 3–0 and retain the Ashes. It was the first time that they had played an Ashes series without a Test defeat since Warwick Armstrong's 5–0 win in Australia in 1920–21 and 3–0 win in England in 1921, just after the last war. The full attendance was 93,011 and receipts of £12,619. The total attendance for the Test series was 853,122 with receipts of £115,858. Bradman said that "The quick resumption of Anglo-Australian Tests had justified itself in every way, psychologically, technically, financially". Len Hutton was flown home for a throat operation, the injured Paul Gibb, James Langridge, Joe Hardstaff went home by sea with Bill Ferguson and the heavy baggage while the rest of the England team sailed east to play in New Zealand.

The Press Corps
The series was covered on radio by Arthur Gilligan, Vic Richardson, Alan McGilvray, Alan Kippax, Bill O'Reilly, Clif Cary and E.W. Swanton. The English press corps formed the Empire Cricket-Writers Club XI, which played cricket with some famous old names; Arthur Mailey, George Duckworth, Richard Whitington, Bill Bowes, Jack Fingleton, Vivian Jenkins, E.W. Swanton, E.M. Wellings and J.M. Kilburn.

1946–47 Test Series Averages
As was the convention of the time, gentlemen (the amateurs) have their initials in front of their surname whilst players (the professionals) have their initials after their name, if used at all. Wally Hammond had been a professional until 1938 when his business interests allowed him to turn amateur, allowing him to captain England. Bill Edrich was a professional who became an amateur in 1947 and captain of Middlesex in 1950. The Australians were all amateurs until the Packer Revolution, even though they played like professionals. Of particular note is that Doug Wright was the biggest wicket-taker on either side with 23 wickets (43.04), but with a higher average than anyone else who has held this position. He was also the chief first–class wicket-taker of the 1946–47 season – 51 wickets (33.31) and bowled just over a third of England's overs; 246.3 compared to 240.2 by Alec Bedser and 246.5 by the rest. Norman Yardley topped England's bowling averages with 10 wickets (37.20) even though he had not bowled for Yorkshire in 1946, though he had taken 6/29 for the MCC against Cambridge University, coming on as the seventh bowler.

References
 Clif Cary, Cricket Controversy, Test matches in Australia 1946–47, T. Werner Laurie Ltd, 1948
 Ray Lindwall, Flying Stumps, Marlin Books, 1954
 Keith Miller, Cricket Crossfire, Oldbourne Press, 1956
 A.G. Moyes, A Century of Cricketers, Angus and Robertson, 1950
 Ray Robinson and Mike Coward, England vs Australia 1932–1985, in E.W. Swanton (ed), Barclay's World of Cricket, Willow, 1986
 E.W. Swanton, Swanton in Australia with MCC 1946–1975, Fontana/Collins, 1975
 Bob Willis and Patrick Murphy, Starting with Grace, A Pictorial Celebration of Cricket 1864–1986, Stanley Paul, 1986

Further reading
 John Arlott, John Arlott's 100 Greatest Batsmen, MacDonald Queen Anne Press, 1986
 Peter Arnold, The Illustrated Encyclopedia of World Cricket, W. H. Smith, 1985
 Ashley Brown, The Pictorial History of Cricket, Bison, 1988
 Bill Frindall, The Wisden Book of Test Cricket 1877–1978, Wisden, 1979
 Tom Graveney and Norman Miller, The Ten Greatest Test Teams Sidgewick and Jackson, 1988
 Chris Harte, A History of Australian Cricket, Andre Deutsch, 1993
 Ray Robinson, On Top Down Under, Cassell, 1975
 E.W. Swanton (ed), Barclay's World of Cricket, Willow, 1986

Ashes series
Ashes series
Ashes series
Ashes series
Australian cricket seasons from 1945–46 to 1969–70
International cricket competitions from 1945–46 to 1960
The Ashes